Henry Withers (c. 1651 – 1729) was a British army officer and politician, who began his career in 1674 during the Franco-Dutch War and reached the rank of Lieutenant General in 1707. A close associate of the Duke of Marlborough during the War of the Spanish Succession, he served in a number of actions, including the 1704 battles of Schellenberg, Blenheim, and Malplaquet in 1709.

Personal details  
His background and origins are unknown, although his funeral monument states he was descended from a military family and gives his age as 78, which means he was born in 1651. He never married; his will divided his estate between his sister Elizabeth and his close friend, Colonel Henry Disney, with whom he shared a house in Greenwich and who arranged his burial in Westminster Abbey. His memorial contains lines reportedly written by the poet Alexander Pope, who was a friend of both men.

Career
He appears to have started his career as part of the British Brigade raised for French service during the 1672 to 1678 Franco-Dutch War, whose senior officers included Percy Kirke and John Churchill, later Duke of Marlborough. Although England left the war in February 1674, the Brigade fought at Entzheim in October 1674, where it suffered heavy casualties and was disbanded in early 1675. 

    

In 1678, England re-entered the war in alliance with the Dutch Republic, and Withers was commissioned as a Lieutenant in one of the new regiments. The war ended in September 1678 before any of these saw service, and as military posts were scarce, he accepted a demotion to ensign and transferred to the Tangier Garrison in a regiment commanded by Percy Kirke. When Tangier was abandoned in 1684, they became part of the expanded army raised by James II, and fought at Sedgemoor in June 1685; ironically named Kirke's Lambs, the regiment became notorious for the brutality with which it treated captured rebels.

Churchill and Kirke were among the first to defect to William III following the November 1688 Glorious Revolution and were both part of the army sent to Ireland in June 1689. Still serving under Kirke, Withers fought at The Boyne, as well as participating in the Capture of Waterford and the unsuccessful First Siege of Limerick. In April 1691, their unit was transferred to Flanders to serve in the Nine Years War. 

Kirke died in October 1691 and Withers found a new patron in the Earl of Romney, who also served in Ireland and was colonel of the First Foot Guards; in February 1695, Romney gave him a commission in his regiment as major, in which role he took part in the capture of Namur later that year.  When the Peace of Ryswick ended the war in 1697, Withers was Lieutenant-Colonel and effective commander of the regiment, since Romney was absent in Ireland and England from 1692 onwards.  

  

With the outbreak of the War of the Spanish Succession in 1701, the army expanded once again and Withers was appointed Brigadier-General in March 1702. During the 1702 and 1703 campaigns in Flanders and the Rhineland, he served under Marlborough, who was Captain General of the army. In April 1704, Romney died and Marlborough became colonel of the First Foot; Withers continued to serve as its Lieutenant-Colonel and was promoted Major General. He commanded a division of infantry at Schellenberg in July and fought at Blenheim in August.     

In 1706, Marlborough arranged for Withers to be appointed Governor of Sheerness, a post he held until his death in 1729. This helped him be elected as MP for the nearby seat of Queenborough in the 1708 election. Although listed as a Whig, he spent little time in Parliament and by 1709 was back in Flanders, where he was wounded at the siege of Tournai. He recovered in time to lead a division of reinforcements to join the main army at Malplaquet, with Marlborough delaying his assault until their arrival on 11 September. Their delayed arrival meant his troops played a minor role in the battle, but their appearance convinced the French to retreat.  

Despite their long association, when Marlborough fell out with Queen Anne, Withers sided with the Queen. He returned from Flanders in the summer of 1710 but did not stand in the October general election, which resulted in a landslide victory for the pro-peace Tories. He was on good terms with Henry St. John, Secretary of State in the new Harley government; in January 1712, Marlborough was replaced as Captain-General by the Tory Duke of Ormonde, and Withers returned to Flanders as commander of the infantry. 

When Anne died in August 1714, there were hopes he would support the Jacobite candidate, James Francis Edward Stuart, but he was strongly committed to the Hanoverian Succession. As a Hanoverian Tory, which included colleagues from his time in the Tangier garrison like Charles Trelawny, he retained his post at Sheerness when George I came to the throne. Although he remained Lieutenant-Colonel of the Foot Guards, he never became colonel and lived quietly at his home in Greenwich until his death in 1729. The lines on his monument in Westminster Abbey were supposedly written by Alexander Pope.

Footnotes

References

Sources
 
 
 
 
 
 
 
 
 
 
 
 

17th-century English people
18th-century English people
English soldiers
1651 births
1729 deaths
Soldiers of the Tangier Garrison
Williamite military personnel of the Williamite War in Ireland
British military personnel of the War of the Spanish Succession
British MPs 1708–1710
Whig (British political party) MPs
British Army generals
Grenadier Guards officers
Burials at Westminster Abbey